is a Japanese company established in 1994 that manufactures high-speed automated optical inspection (AOI) and solder paste inspection (SPI) systems for the electronics assembly markets. Saki Corporation has headquarters in Tokyo, Japan with offices and sales and support centers on the world.

Saki Corporation has Quality Management System JIS Q 9001:2008 and ISO9001:2008 certifications. The company's CEO is Koike Norihiro.

AOI 

References

External links
  

Engineering companies of Japan
Japanese companies established in 1994